Giuseppe Ferlito (born 1975) is an Italian film director and screenwriter.

Biography
Director and screenwriter Giuseppe Ferlito was born in Padua September 3, 1975. After his degree in political science at the University of Padua, he moved to Milan, where he attended a master in Cinema and Television Production. He started working as a freelance in several film production companies in Milan, which produce advertisements and film clips. Later, he moved to Rome where he started to work in the cinema, at first as a second assistant director and later as a first assistant director. He started his career in Italian cinema working mainly in Cinecittà and later collaborating with international production companies.

In 2010, after ten years of experience he made his debut as a scriptwriter, writing with actor/director Jordi Mollà, the script for 88 directed by Mollà himself: Movie produced by Media Films where Ferlito is also the second unit director. 

In 2012 he made a debut as director with the dramatic movie Presto farà giorno, which he wrote and co-produced by Rai Cinema and Settima Entertainment. The movie, entirely shot in Rome, analyses problematic social themes such as drug and anorexia, tells a story of three people who, with their vulnerabilities and insecurities, pursue the need to assert their identities.
Presto farà giorno won in 2014 the award "Special Mention" at Ariano International Film Festival.

In 2014, with the actor and director Jordi Mollà he wrote the script for Duelo.

In 2015, in conjunction with 72nd Venice film festival, he received the award The glass Lion in the category Venetian's excellency in the cinema, for original direction, at Cinema Veneto 2015.

In 2018 he was the second unit director of the movie Red Land produced by the Venice Film.

In 2021 he directed the documentary The Private Lives of Jordi Mollà & Domingo Zapata.

Filmography

Director
 Look Around – short – (2022)
 The Private Lives of Jordi Mollà & Domingo Zapata (2021)
 Una luce sempre accesa – short – (2021)
 I confini – short – (2020)
 In soccorso al tempo – short – (2017)
 Presto farà giorno (2013)
 Casa dolce Casa – short – (2011)

Second unit director
 Red Land (2018)
 88 (2012)

Screenwriter 
 Look Around – short – (2022)
 The Private Lives of Jordi Mollà & Domingo Zapata (2021)
 Una luce sempre accesa – short – (2021)
 I confini – short – (2020)
 In soccorso al tempo – short – (2017)
 Duelo  (2014)
 Presto farà giorno (2013)
 88 (2012)
 Casa dolce Casa – short – (2011)

References 

1975 births
Living people
Italian film directors
Italian male screenwriters
University of Padua alumni